Robert Ian McStocker is a male former athlete who competed for England.

Athletics career
McStocker was selected by England to represent his country in athletics events. He was a two times National university champion over 100 yards.

He represented England in the 100 yards, at the 1966 British Empire and Commonwealth Games in Kingston, Jamaica.

He was a member of the Ilford Athletics Club and was the 1966 Southern champion.

Personal life
He was a teacher by trade.

References

1947 births
English male sprinters
Athletes (track and field) at the 1966 British Empire and Commonwealth Games
Living people
Commonwealth Games competitors for England
20th-century English people